Protestant Christianity (in comparison to earlier Roman Catholicism) entered China in the early 19th century, taking root in a significant way during the Qing dynasty. Some historians consider the Taiping Rebellion to have been influenced by Protestant teachings. Since the mid-20th century, there has been an increase in the number of Christian practitioners in China. According to a survey published in 2010 there are approximately 40 million Protestants in China. As of 2019, Fenggang Yang, a sociologist of religion at Purdue University, estimated that there are around 100 million Protestant Christians in China. Other estimates place the number of Protestant Christians at around 40-60 million

Much of this growth has occurred in informal networks referred to as house churches, the proliferation of which began in the 1950s when many Chinese Catholics and Protestants began to reject state-controlled structures purported to represent them. Members of such groups are now said to represent the "silent majority" of Chinese Christians and represent many diverse theological traditions.

Early history

Protestant Christianity did not arrive in China until Robert Morrison of the London Missionary Society began work in 1807 at Macau.

Under the "fundamental laws" of China, one section is titled "Wizards, Witches, and all Superstitions, prohibited." The Jiaqing Emperor in 1814 A.D. added a sixth clause in this section with reference to Christianity. It was modified in 1821 and printed in 1826 by the Daoguang Emperor. It sentenced Europeans to death for spreading Christianity among Han Chinese and Manchus. Christians who would not repent their conversion were sent to Muslim cities in Xinjiang, to be given as slaves to Muslim leaders and beys.

The clause stated: "People of the Western Ocean, [Europeans or Portuguese,] should they propagate in the country the religion of heaven's Lord, [name given to Christianity by the Catholics,] or clandestinely print books, or collect congregations to be preached to, and thereby deceive many people, or should any Tartars [Manchus] or Chinese, in their turn, propagate the doctrines and clandestinely give names, (as in baptism,) inflaming and misleading many, if proved by authentic testimony, the head or leader shall be sentenced to immediate death by strangulations : he who propagates the religion, inflaming and deceiving the people, if the number be not large, and no names be given, shall be sentenced to strangulation after a period of imprisonment. Those who are merely hearers or followers of the doctrine, if they will not repent and recant, shall be transported to the Mohammedan cities (in Turkistan) and given to be slaves to the beys and other powerful Mohammedans who are able to coerce them. . . . All civil and military officers who may fail to detect Europeans clandestinely residing in the country within their jurisdiction, and propagating their religion, thereby deceiving the multitude, shall be delivered over to the Supreme Board and be subjected to a court of inquiry."

Some hoped that the Chinese government would discriminate between Protestantism and Catholicism, since the law was directed at Catholicism, but after Protestant missionaries in 1835-6 gave Christian books to Chinese, the Daoguang Emperor demanded to know who were the "traitorous natives in "Canton who had supplied them with books." The foreign missionaries were strangled or expelled by the Chinese.

In 1860 Protestant missions were confined to five coastal cities. By the end of the century, Western powers had forced the government to allow missionaries into the interior. During the second half of the century, increased numbers of missionaries entered the country. Scores of new missionary societies had been organized in the United States after the American Civil War and participation increased from Great Britain as well.  Several thousand missionaries were working in all parts of China. The 1859 Awakening in Britain and the example of J. Hudson Taylor (1832–1905) were influential.

By 1865 when Taylor's China Inland Mission began, 30 different Protestant groups were working in China. The diversity of denominations represented did not equate to more missionaries on the field. In the seven provinces in which Protestant missionaries had already been working, there were an estimated 204 million people with only 91 workers, while there were eleven other provinces in inland China with a population estimated at 197 million, for whom absolutely nothing had been attempted. Besides the London Missionary Society, and the American Board of Commissioners for Foreign Missions, there were missionaries affiliated with Baptists, Southern Baptists, Presbyterians, Methodists, Episcopalians, and Wesleyans. Most missionaries came from England, the United States, Sweden, France, Germany, Switzerland, or the Netherlands.

In addition to the publication and distribution of Christian literature and Bibles, the Protestant Christian missionary movement in China furthered the dispersion of knowledge with other printed works of history and science. As the missionaries went to work among the Chinese, they established and developed schools and introduced the latest techniques in medicine. The mission schools were viewed with some suspicion by the traditional Chinese teachers, but they differed from the norm by offering a basic education to poor Chinese, both boys and girls, who had no hope of learning at a school before the days of the Chinese Republic.

The Chinese Recorder and Missionary Journal, founded in Shanghai in 1869, was a prominent outlet for reporting on the mission enterprise and for controversy and discussion.

The 1800s witnessed the expansion of Christianity beyond the isolated areas of the Treaty Ports by thousands of new missionaries who entered the interior of China. Western missionaries spread Christianity rapidly through the foreign-occupied coastal cities; the Taiping Rebellion was connected in its origins to the missionary activity. British and American denominations, such as the British Methodist Church, continued to send missionaries until they were prevented from doing so following the establishment of the People's Republic of China. Protestant missionaries played a significant role in introducing knowledge of China to the United States and the United States to China.

Protestant Christians in China established the first clinics and hospitals, provided the first training for nurses, opened the first modern schools, worked to abolish practices such as foot binding, and improve treatment of maids. They launched charitable work and distributed food to the poor. They also opposed the opium trade and brought treatment to many who were addicted. Some of the early leaders of the Chinese Republic, such as Sun Yat-sen, were converts to Christianity and were influenced by its teachings.

Contemporary mainland China

Since the loosening of restrictions on religion after the 1970s, Christianity has grown significantly within the People's Republic. The Protestant Three-Self Patriotic Movement and China Christian Council have affiliations with government and follow the regulations imposed upon them. Three-Self Patriotic Movement by 2005 claimed to have 10-15 million worshippers, while the total number of Protestants, including unofficial house churches is calculated to be of 30 million members.

Suppression
Beginning in 2013 the government began a campaign of suppression targeting large Protestant and Catholic churches with steeples and crosses. 2018 was marked by demolition of an Evangelical church boasting 50,000 members in Linfen, Shanxi.

Protestant worship in the present
The Chinese Union Version of the Bible, the Chinese New Hymnal, the Lord's Prayer as it is written in the Chinese Union Version and the Apostles' Creed are usually used by most Protestant worshipers in present-day China.

The hymnal Canaan Hymns is one of the most successful underground Christian publications in China. In addition to house churches, it is used in Three-Self Patriotic Movement churches.

Bible in China 

Starting in the early 19th century, many translation of the Bible into Chinese were made by Protestants, Catholics and Orthodox Christians. An early translation was made by British missionary and linguist Robert Morrison (1782–1834). More than 300 million copies of the Bible in Chinese have been published and disseminated since 1823 with active participation of the Protestant missionaries from 1807 to 1953.

Unregistered churches and cults 
Outside of the state-sanctioned Three-Self Church (三自教會), whose doctrines are in line with mainline Protestantism and have pro-government stances, what is intended as "Protestantism" (Jīdūjiào xīnjiào) in China. There are various dissident churches outside of the Three-Self Church. They primarily operate in the form of the so-called "family churches" (家庭教會), "underground churches" (地下教會) or "underground heavens" (地下天國), small worship groups in family homes. These have generally been called "house churches" by Western Christian media. Family church networks are especially present in the provinces of Zhejiang and Henan. They have missionaries in other provinces and even abroad to neighboring states, such as Taiwan.

There also includes a variety of cults based on the Bible teachings, such as Eastern Lightning, Mentuhui, Beili Wang, The Shouters, the Total Scope Church, the Fangcheng Fellowship, the China Gospel Fellowship and the Meeting Hall. Many of these less mainstream groups have been labeled "heterodox teachings" and are suppressed by Chinese legal authorities.

Names for God

Shangdi (literally "Highest Emperor") is the term used more commonly by Protestants to translate "God". The Catholic Church historically favored Tianzhu (literally "Lord of Heaven"), hence the Chinese name for Catholicism: Tianzhujiao.

See also
 Che Kam Kong
 Christianity in China
 Catholic Church in China
 List of Protestant theological seminaries in the People's Republic of China
 Chinese Union Version of the Bible
 Chinese New Hymnal
 China Christian Council
 Protestant missions in China 1807–1953
 Protestantism in Sichuan
 Alimujiang Yimiti

References

Sources

Further reading

 
 
 
 Dunch, Ryan. Fuzhou Protestants and the Making of a Modern China, 1857-1927 (2001) 293p.
 Fairbank, John King, ed. The missionary enterprise in China and America (1974) online free to borrow 14 essays by  scholars
 Fay, Peter W. "The Protestant Mission and the Opium War," Pacific Historical Review 1971 40(2): 145-161
 
 
 
 Latourette, Kenneth Scott. Christianity in a Revolutionary Age. Vol. III : The 19th Century Outside Europe; the Americas, the Pacific, Asia and Africa. (1969)
 Latourette, Kenneth Scott. Christianity in a Revolutionary Age, Vol. V: The twentieth century outside Europe: the Americas, the Pacific, Asia, and Africa: the emerging world Christian community (1962)
 Lian, Xi. "Western Protestant Missions and Modern Chinese Nationalist Dreams," East Asian History 2006-2007 (32-33): 199-216
 Lian, Xi. The Conversion of Missionaries: Liberalism in American Protestant Missions in China, 1907-1932 (1997).
 Neils, Patricia, ed. United States Attitudes and Policies toward China The Impact of American Missionaries (1990)
 "Pfister, Lauren F. Striving for "The Whole Duty of Man": James Legge and the Scottish Protestant  Encounter with China: Assessing Confluences in Scottish Nonconformism, Chinese Missionary Scholarship, Victorian Sinology, and Chinese Protestantism (2007)
 Rabe, Valentin H. The Home Base of American China Missions, 1880-1920 (1978). 299 pp.
 Semple, Rhonda Anne. Missionary Women: Gender, Professionalism and the Victorian Idea of Christian Mission (2003) covers 1865-1910
 
 
 Varg, Paul A. Missionaries, Chinese, and Diplomats: The American Protestant Missionary Movement in China, 1890-1952 (1958)
 Varg, Paul A. "Missionaries and Relations Between the United States and China in the Late Nineteenth Century," World Affairs Quarterly 1956 27(2): 153-171

External links
Biographical Dictionary of Chinese Christianity
Bible in Chinese
Chinese Bible Resources

 
China